John Hubert Kelly (July 20, 1939 – September 15, 2011) was a United States diplomat.

Biography

John Hubert Kelly was born in Fond du Lac, Wisconsin, on July 20, 1939.  He attended Emory University, receiving a B.A. in 1961. He spent 1962 through 1965 working as a teacher, first in Danville, Virginia, then in Niles, Michigan.

Kelly entered the United States Foreign Service in 1965.  His first posting was in Turkey, first in Adana, then in Ankara, where he worked from 1965 to 1967. He spent 1968 in Thai language instruction and was then posted to Songkhla from 1969 to 1971. He spent 1971–72 as a student at the Armed Forces Staff College. He spent 1972–73 working on political-military affairs in the Bureau of Intelligence and Research.  In 1973, he was detailed to the United States Department of Defense as an expert on Thailand, and then spent 1974 working in the Bureau of Political-Military Affairs.  He spent 1975–76 as Special Assistant to Counselor of the United States Department of State Helmut Sonnenfeldt.  He returned to the field in 1976 and spent the next four years as a political-military officer in Paris.  In 1981–82 he was the Una Chapman Cox Fellow and Diplomatic Associate at the Institute for the Study of Diplomacy at Georgetown University and worked on French defense and international terrorism.

Returning to the State Department, Kelly spent 1982–83 as Senior Deputy Assistant Secretary of State for Public Affairs and 1983–85 as Principal Deputy Assistant Secretary of State for European and Canadian Affairs. From 1985 to 1986, he was Short Terms Project Specialist in the Office of the Under Secretary of State for Management.

On July 17, 1986, President of the United States Ronald Reagan nominated Kelly as United States Ambassador to Lebanon, a post he held for the next two years.  He returned to Washington, D.C. in 1988 to become Deputy Director of Policy Planning.

President George H. W. Bush then nominated Kelly as Assistant Secretary of State for Near Eastern and South Asian Affairs and Kelly held this office from June 16, 1989, until September 30, 1991.  Bush next nominated Kelly as United States Ambassador to Finland; he presented his credentials on December 20, 1991, and held this position until July 5, 1994.

Kelly later founded John Kelly Consulting, Inc., a consulting firm that provided its American clients with strategic, marketing and business advice for their overseas operations.

References

External links

1939 births
United States Assistant Secretaries of State
Ambassadors of the United States to Finland
Ambassadors of the United States to Lebanon
Emory University alumni
2011 deaths
People from Fond du Lac, Wisconsin
United States Foreign Service personnel